The Feernic is a right tributary of the river Târnava Mare in Romania. It discharges into the Târnava Mare near Cristuru Secuiesc.

References

Rivers of Romania
Rivers of Harghita County